The 1st August Cup was a motor race, run to Formula One rules, held on 2 August 1954 at Crystal Palace Circuit, London. The race was run over two heats of 10 laps and a final of 10 laps, and was won by British driver Reg Parnell in a Ferrari 500.

Parnell started from pole position in Heat 1 and set fastest lap in the heat, and also in the final. Connaught driver Tony Rolt started from pole position in Heat 2 and won, while Tony Crook set fastest lap in that heat in a Cooper.

Maserati driver Roy Salvadori was second in the final and Rolt was third.

The name of the event is referred to in at least one source as the August Trophy Race.

Entries

Results

Heats

Final

References 

August
August